The  Equitable Life Building is a  International style skyscraper in the Koreatown neighborhood of Los Angeles, California. It was completed in 1969 and has 34 floors. It is tied with the Los Angeles City Hall for the 36th tallest building in Los Angeles. Welton Becket & Associates designed the building for the Equitable Life Insurance Company. The facade is made of precast concrete that was sandblasted to expose the beige Texas limestone aggregate.

The lobby of the Equitable Life Building hosts art in its vitrines. This space is called Equitable Vitrines. These vitrines have hosted art including Jennifer Moon's Will You Still Love Me: Learning to Love Yourself, It Is The Greatest Gift of All in 2014-2015. In an interview with Ocula Magazine, Equitable Vitrines founders Ellie Lee and Matt Connolly explained that they realised through negotiations with the building's management, 'bureaucrats, artists, and tenants—each required a different way of thinking and speaking about what art is and what it can or should do.'

Since March 2, 2015, the Equitable Life Building has served as the chancery of the Philippine Consulate General in Los Angeles, occupying part of its fifth floor.

See also
List of tallest buildings in Los Angeles

References

Skyscraper office buildings in Los Angeles
Welton Becket buildings
International style architecture in California
Office buildings completed in 1969